Studia Islamika is a triannual peer-reviewed open access academic journal covering Islamic studies, especially concerning Indonesia and Southeast Asia in general. It was established in 1994 and is published by the Center for the Study of Islam and Society (Syarif Hidayatullah State Islamic University Jakarta). The editor-in-chief is Azyumardi Azra (Syarif Hidayatullah State Islamic University Jakarta). Articles are published in English or Arabic.

Abstracting and indexing
The journal is abstracted and indexed in:
ATLA Religion Database
EBSCO databases
Emerging Sources Citation Index
Index Islamicus
Scopus

References

External links

Islamic studies journals
Multilingual journals
Triannual journals
Publications established in 1994
Open access journals